William Muir (8 February 1907 – 27 November 1964) was an Australian cricketer. He played one first-class cricket match for Victoria in 1930.

See also
 List of Victoria first-class cricketers

References

External links
 

1907 births
1964 deaths
Australian cricketers
Victoria cricketers
Cricketers from Melbourne